The Mid-South Conference (MSC) is a college athletic conference affiliated with the National Association of Intercollegiate Athletics (NAIA). Member institutions are located in Kentucky, Ohio, and Tennessee. The league is headquartered in Louisville, Kentucky, and the commissioner is Eric Ward.

The Mid-South Conference has 11 full members: Bethel (TN), Campbellsville, Cumberland (TN), Cumberlands (KY), Freed–Hardeman, Georgetown College (KY), Lindsey Wilson, Pikeville, Shawnee State, Thomas More, and UT Southern. Eight of these members sponsor football; Freed–Hardeman, Shawnee State, and UT Southern do not.

The Mid-South Conference also has six associate members that compete primarily in other conferences. Faulkner, Kentucky Christian, Union and recently former member Bluefield are associate members of the MSC for football and men's volleyball, and Reinhardt is an associate member of the MSC for football and men's volleyball.  This gave the conference 13 members for football.  In the spring of 2016, the conference expanded to 20 members, adding the six football members of the Sun Conference, as well as Faulkner University for football, On January 4, 2018, the conference added Keiser University for football, and St. Thomas announced in July they were joining the conference for football in 2019. Another Sun Conference member, Florida Memorial in Miami Gardens, Florida, joined the MSC as an affiliate member for football in 2020, after re-adding the sport.

History

In April 2018, Thomas More University (then Thomas More College), which had been an NAIA member before moving to NCAA Division III in 1990, announced that it had been formally invited to re-join the NAIA in the 2019–20 academic year as a member of the Mid-South Conference. The school, while acknowledging that it was considering this move, denied published reports that it had accepted the invitation. Thomas More eventually confirmed in July that it would join the Mid-South in 2019.

In 2020, Bethel University became a Mid-South full member, brought track and field back to the MSC, and transferred all sports other than football and archery to the conference (prior to that, Bethel was an associate member of the MSC for football and archery only); additionally, Freed–Hardeman and UT Southern, then known as Martin Methodist College, also joined Mid-South.

In December 2020, Life University also announced its departure from the MSC for the Southern States Athletic Conference in 2022–23.

Most recently, Thomas More announced in August 2021 that it would return to the NCAA, but this time in Division II as a member of the Great Midwest Athletic Conference (G-MAC). It joined the G-MAC as a provisional member in July 2022, but continues as an NAIA member and in the Mid-South through 2022–23, after which it will start G-MAC competition. Later, the Sun Conference published on December 22 its reinstatement of football for the 2022 season. Recently, in July 2022, the Appalachian Athletic Conference announced of adding football as a sponsored sport.

Chronlogical timeline
 1995 - The Mid-South Conference (MSC) was founded. Charter members included Campbellsville College (now Campbellsville University), Cumberland College of Kentucky (now the University of the Cumberlands), Georgetown College, North Greenville College (now North Greenville University), and Union College beginning the 1995–96 academic year.
 1996 - Cumberland College of Tennessee (now Cumberland University) and Lambuth University joined the Mid-South in the 1996–97 academic year.
 1996 - Bethel College of Tennessee joined the Mid-South as an affiliate member for football in the 1996 fall season (1996-97 academic year).
 1997 - Bethel (Tenn.) left the Mid-South as an affiliate member for football after the 1996 fall season (1996-97 academic year).
 2000 - Lindsey Wilson College and Pikeville College (now the University of Pikeville; a.k.a. UPike) joined the Mid-South in the 2000–01 academic year.
 2001 - North Greenville left the Mid-South to join the Division II ranks of the National Collegiate Athletic Association (NCAA) as an NCAA D-II Independent after the 2000–01 academic year.
 2002 - Cumberland (Tenn.) and Union (Ky.) left the Mid-South as full members, while remaining in the conference as associate members for football and some Olympic sports after the 2001–02 academic year.
 2003 - The University of Virginia's College at Wise (UVA Wise) joined the Mid-South as an affiliate member for football (with Bethel (Tenn.) re-joining for football and some Olympic sports in the 2003 fall season (2003–04 academic year).
 2006 - Lambuth left the Mid-South as a full member, while remaining in the conference as an associate member for football after the 2005–06 academic year.
 2006 - West Virginia University Institute of Technology (West Virginia Tech or WVU Tech) joined the Mid-South in the 2006–07 academic year.
 2008 - St. Catharine College joined the Mid-South in the 2008–09 academic year.
 2009 - The University of Rio Grande joined the Mid-South in the 2009–10 academic year.
 2010 - Lambuth left the Mid-South as an affiliate member for football after the 2009 fall season (2009-10 academic year).
 2010 - Shawnee State University joined the Mid-South (with UVA Wise joining for all sports) in the 2010–11 academic year.
 2012 - West Virginia Tech left the Mid-South to become an NAIA Independent (which would later join the Kentucky Intercollegiate Athletic Conference (KIAC; now known as the River States Conference) beginning the 2015–16 academic year) after the 2011–12 academic year.
 2012 - Bluefield College (now Bluefield University) joined the Mid-South (with Cumberland (Tenn.) re-joining for all sports) in the 2012–13 academic year.
 2013 - UVA Wise left the Mid-South and the NAIA entirely to fully align with the NCAA Division II ranks, while joining the Mountain East Conference after spending provisionally one season in the Great Midwest Athletic Conference (G-MAC) after the 2012–13 academic year.
 2014 - Bluefield left the Mid-South as a full member to re-join the Appalachian Athletic Conference (AAC), while remaining in the conference as an associate member for football and some Olympic sports after the 2013–14 academic year.
 2014 - Rio Grande left the Mid-South to join the KIAC after the 2013–14 academic year.
 2014 - Life University joined the Mid-South in the 2014–15 academic year.
 2016 - St. Catherine's left the Mid-South as the school announced that it would close after the 2015–16 academic year.
 2019 - Thomas More University joined the Mid-South in the 2019–20 academic year.
 2020 - Freed–Hardeman University and Martin Methodist College (now the University of Tennessee Southern) joined the Mid-South (with Bethel (Tenn.) joining for all sports) in the 2020–21 academic year.
 2022 - Life would leave the Mid-South to join the Southern States Athletic Conference (SSAC) beginning the 2022–23 academic year.
 2022 - Thomas More returned to the NCAA, but in the NCAA Division II ranks and joined the Great Midwest Athletic Conference (G-MAC) as a provisional member in the 2022–23 academic year. Until then, they would remain committed in the Mid-South and the NAIA, until full membership in the G-MAC and NCAA D-II would begin in the 2023–24 academic year.
 2022 - Wilberforce University joined the Mid-South in the 2022–23 academic year.
 2022 - Three institutions will leave the Mid-South to join their respective new home primary conferences: Shawnee State to the RSC and Pikeville (UPike) to the AAC, with UT Southern going back to the SSAC, all beginning the 2023–24 academic year.

Member schools

Current members
The Mid-South currently has 12 full members, all but two are private schools:

Notes

Affiliate members
The Mid-South currently has 23 associate members, all are private schools:

Notes

Former members
The Mid-South had eight former full members, all but two were private schools:

Notes

Former affiliate members
The Mid-South had 25 associate members, all but two were private schools:

Notes

Membership timeline

Sports
Member teams compete in 28 sports: 13 men's, 13 women's and 2 mixed.

In addition, the Mid-South Conference also conducts championships for Esports and competitive dance. The MSC also stages invitational tournaments for junior varsity squads in the sports of men's and women's basketball, baseball, softball, and women's volleyball, if enough schools sponsor JV teams in a given year.

Football divisions
Beginning with the 2017 season, The Sun Conference and Mid-South merged their football conferences into the largest football conference in college sports. Edward Waters was previously a full member of the Sun Conference from 2006 to 2010 and a football affiliate member from 2014 to 2016 seasons. Edward Waters left after the 2018 football season.

However, the Sun Division folded when its teams left the Mid-South after the Sun Conference reinstated football for 2022, leaving the Mid-South with 15 football members. Later, the Appalachian Division folded when the AAC announced to sponsor the sport for the 2022 fall season, leaving the Mid-South with 9 football members.

 Bethel (Tenn.)
 Campbellsville
 Cumberland (Tenn.)
 Cumberlands (Ky.)
 Faulkner
 Georgetown
 Lindsey Wilson
 Pikeville
 Thomas More

Notes
 - Mid-South full member
 - Mid-South affiliate member

References

External links

 
1995 establishments in the United States
Organizations based in Louisville, Kentucky
Sports leagues established in 1995